Harold "Harry" Pinner (born 26 September 1956) is an English former professional rugby league footballer who played in the 1970s and 1980s.

Background
Harry Pinner was born in St. Helens, Lancashire, England, he was the landlord of the Victoria Inn public house, in Newton-le-Willows, and Parr Arms public house, in Grappenhall, Warrington.

Playing career

International honours
Harry Pinner won caps for England while at St. Helens in 1980 against Wales, and France, in 1981 against France, and won caps for Great Britain while at St. Helens in 1980 against New Zealand (sub), New Zealand, in 1985 against New Zealand (3 matches), in 1986 against France, and while at Widnes in 1986 against Australia.

Only three players have scored drop goals for both England & Great Britain, they are Bobbie Goulding, Sean Long, and Harry Pinner.

Premiership Final appearances
Harry Pinner played , and was man of the match winning the Harry Sunderland Trophy in St. Helens' 36–16 victory over Hull Kingston Rovers in the Premiership Final during the 1984–85 season at Elland Road, Leeds on Saturday 11 May 1985.

County Cup Final appearances
Harry Pinner played  in St. Helens 0–16 defeat by Warrington in the 1982 Lancashire County Cup Final during the 1982–83 season at Central Park, Wigan on Saturday 23 October 1982, and played  in the 28–16 victory over Wigan in the 1984 Lancashire County Cup Final during the 1984–85 season at Central Park, Wigan on Sunday 28 October 1984.

BBC2 Floodlit Trophy Final appearances
Harry Pinner played  in St. Helens' 11–26 defeat by Hull Kingston Rovers in the 1977 BBC2 Floodlit Trophy Final during the 1977–78 season at Craven Park, Kingston upon Hull on Tuesday 13 December 1977, and played  in the 7–13 defeat by Widnes in the 1978 BBC2 Floodlit Trophy Final during the 1978–79 season at Knowsley Road, St. Helens on Tuesday 12 December 1978.

Honoured at St Helens R.F.C.
Harry Pinner is a St Helens R.F.C. Hall of Fame inductee.

Genealogical information
Harry Pinner is the nephew of the rugby league footballer for St Helens, Warrington, Blackpool Borough, and Liverpool City; Harold 'Ike' Fishwick, and the rugby league footballer for St Helens; Bill Fishwick.

References

External links
 Profile at saints.org.uk
 Photograph "1980 Great Britain v New Zealand - Only 10,946 attended this game at Odsal but it was still the biggest Test match crowd of the series. New Zealand won the game 12-8. - 01/01/1980" at rlhp.co.uk
 Photograph "Harry Pinner - Harry Pinner signed for Bradford Northern from St Helens in 1988. He was a classic ball playing loose forward. - 01/01/1988" at rlhp.co.uk
 Statistics at rugby.widnes.tv

1956 births
Living people
Bradford Bulls players
Carlisle RLFC players
England national rugby league team players
English rugby league players
Great Britain national rugby league team captains
Great Britain national rugby league team players
Leigh Leopards captains
Leigh Leopards players
Rugby league locks
Rugby league players from St Helens, Merseyside
St Helens R.F.C. captains
St Helens R.F.C. players
Widnes Vikings players